Emmanuel Lawrence "Manny" Ubilla (born 26 June 1986) is an American-Puerto Rican professional basketball player for the Czech club NH Ostrava. Standing at 1.90 m (6 ft 3 in), Ubilla mainly plays the point guard position. He played college basketball for the Lackawanna College Falcons and the Fairleigh Dickinson Knights and played professionally in several European countries.

Professional career
During the 2013–14 season, Ubilla played for the Den Helder Kings of the Dutch Basketball League (DBL). Ubilla was the assists leader of the DBL season, as he averaged 5.6 assists over 36 games. Third-seeded Den Helder was eliminated in the semi-finals of the playoffs, losing 3–0 to SPM Shoeters.

On 14 August 2014, Ubilla signed with Tapiolan Honka of the Finnish Korisliiga. After the season, Ubilla signed with Piratas de Quebradillas.

On 26 October 2015, Ubilla signed a one-year contract with Kaposvár of the Hungarian NB I/A.

On 1 August 2016, Ubilla signed with Hungarian side ZTE.

On 19 August 2017, Ubilla signed with Latvian side BK Ventspils of the Latvian Basketball League and the Basketball Champions League. He averaged 11 points, 3.2 rebounds and 5.9 assists in 14 matches in the Basketball Champions League, where Ventspils was eliminated after the regular season.

On 3 December 2018, Ubilla returned to his former team Kaposvári KK of the Hungarian NB I/A.

Honours
BC Kolín
All-NBL Team
Second team (1): 2009
All-NBL Defensive Team (1): 2009

Den Helder Kings
DBL All-Star (1): 2014
DBL assists leader (1): 2014

References

External links
Profile at Heinrich Sports

1986 births
Living people
American expatriate basketball people in the Czech Republic
American expatriate basketball people in Finland
American expatriate basketball people in Greece
American expatriate basketball people in Hungary
American expatriate basketball people in Latvia
American expatriate basketball people in Lithuania
American expatriate basketball people in the Netherlands
American expatriate basketball people in Slovakia
American men's basketball players
Atléticos de San Germán players
Basketball players from New Jersey
BC Kolín players
BC Nový Jičín players
BK Inter Bratislava players
BK Ventspils players
Den Helder Kings players
Dutch Basketball League players
Espoon Honka players
Fairleigh Dickinson Knights men's basketball players
Freehold Township High School alumni
Junior college men's basketball players in the United States
Kaposvári KK players
Kymis B.C. players
Piratas de Quebradillas players
Point guards
BK NH Ostrava players
Puerto Rican men's basketball players
Shooting guards
Sportspeople from Monmouth County, New Jersey
ZTE KK players